Engler is a surname of German origin. Notable people named Engler include:

Adolf Engler (1844–1930), German botanist
Bernd Engler (born 1954), German Anglicist, president of the University of Tübingen
Chris Engler (born 1959), American basketball player
Claire Engler (born 2001), American actress
Daniel Engler (born 1977), American wrestling referee
Hartmut Engler (born 1961), German singer, musician group Pur
Henry Engler (born 1946), Uruguayan neuroscientist
John Engler (born 1948), American politician and businessman, Governor of Michigan
Karl Engler (1842–1925), German chemist, academic and politician
Kevin P. Engler (born 1959), American politician
Michael Engler, American television director
Robert Engler (1922–2007), American political scientist
Selli Engler (1899–1972), German journalist
Steven Engler (born 1962), Canadian religion scholar
Steven Engler (Minnesota politician) (born 1949), American farmer and politician
Tina Engler (born 1972), American author
Yves Engler (born 1979), Canadian political activist

German-language surnames
Ethnonymic surnames